Todd William Simpson (born May 28, 1973) is a Canadian former ice hockey player who spent parts of 10 seasons in the National Hockey League. He is currently a real estate agent in Kelowna, British Columbia.

Playing career
Simpson played at Brown University before switching to Canadian junior hockey with the Tri-City Americans and Saskatoon Blades of the Western Hockey League.

In 1994, he was signed by the Calgary Flames, for whom he would be a member of until 1999.

In the season opener against the Vancouver Canucks, on October 5, 1996, Simpson pushed future Hall of Famer Pavel Bure into the boards head-first which gave Bure whiplash.

For the 1999–2000 NHL season, Simpson moved to the Florida Panthers and was traded the following season to the Phoenix Coyotes.

After being claimed off waivers by the Mighty Ducks of Anaheim to start the 2003–04 NHL season, Simpson scored a career-high 4 goals, only to be traded to the Ottawa Senators.

Simpson played his first season overseas during the 2004–05 NHL lockout, winning the Danish league championship for Herning Blue Fox, with his teammate and younger brother Kent. He returned to the NHL to play with the Chicago Blackhawks and the Montreal Canadiens the following season.

During 2006–07 season, Simpson played for the Hannover Scorpions of the Deutsche Eishockey Liga in Germany. During the playoffs, he received a 12-game suspension for abuse of an official. The New York Islanders attempted to bring him back to the NHL for a playoff push. However, the NHL upheld his DEL suspension and Simpson would not play another professional game.

Personal
In 2011 Simpson was the 8th hockey player cast for the 3rd season of the Canadian TV show "Battle of the Blades."  He was partnered with United States Olympian Marcy Hinzmann, but they were the first couple eliminated.

Career statistics

External links

1973 births
Living people
Herning Blue Fox players
Battle of the Blades participants
Brown Bears men's ice hockey players
Calgary Flames captains
Calgary Flames players
Canadian ice hockey defencemen
Chicago Blackhawks players
Florida Panthers players
Hannover Scorpions players
Ice hockey people from British Columbia
Mighty Ducks of Anaheim players
Montreal Canadiens players
Ottawa Senators players
People from North Vancouver
Phoenix Coyotes players
Saint John Flames players
Saskatoon Blades players
Tampa Bay Lightning scouts
Tri-City Americans players
Undrafted National Hockey League players
Canadian expatriate ice hockey players in Denmark
Canadian expatriate ice hockey players in Germany